Slipknot is an American heavy metal band from Des Moines, Iowa. The band was founded in 1995 by vocalist Anders Colsefni, guitarists Donnie Steele and Josh Brainard, bassist Paul Gray, drummer Joey Jordison and percussionist Shawn "Clown" Crahan, who released the group's first demo Mate. Feed. Kill. Repeat. in 1996. After its release, the band went through a number of lineup changes, replacing Colsefni with Corey Taylor, Steele with Mick Thomson and Brainard with Jim Root, as well as adding second percussionist Chris Fehn, turntablist Sid Wilson and sampler Craig "133" Jones. The nine-piece's official debut album, Slipknot, was produced by Ross Robinson and released by Roadrunner Records in 1999. Most of the songwriting was credited to all nine members except Root, who had joined the band late into the recording process.

The follow-up to Slipknot, entitled Iowa, was released in 2001 and credited all nine band members for songwriting. Many songs from Slipknot and Iowa were later included on the band's first video album, Disasterpieces, recorded in London, England and released in 2002. The band's third album, Vol. 3: (The Subliminal Verses), was produced by Rick Rubin and released in 2004; all songs were credited to the full band again. Slipknot's first live album, 9.0: Live, was released in 2005 and featured songs from the group's three studio albums. Fourth album All Hope Is Gone followed in 2008, which credited all nine members for songwriting and was produced by Dave Fortman.

Paul Gray died of an "accidental overdose of morphine and fentanyl" on May 24, 2010. The band dedicated the 2010 video album (sic)nesses to the bassist, which was recorded live at Download Festival in 2009. After Joey Jordison left the band in 2013, the band added Alessandro Venturella and Jay Weinberg on bass and drums, respectively. .5: The Gray Chapter was released in 2014 and featured songs primarily written by Corey Taylor and Jim Root, with some contributions from Shawn Crahan and Craig Jones.

Released Songs

Unofficially released and unreleased songs

See also
Slipknot discography

Footnotes

References

External links
List of Slipknot songs at AllMusic
Slipknot official website

 
Slipknot